, better known by her stage name , is a Japanese actress from Tokyo.

Biography

Satomi Ishihara was born on December 24, 1986, in Tokyo. She is of blood type A, and her height is 157 cm.

Satomi began her acting profession in 2003 at the age of 17 when she starred in the drama kimi wa Petto, starring Jun Matsumoto and Koyuki. She has devoted equal time to television serials and the movies. Satomi was nominated for several such awards such as Best Actress at the 46th Blue Ribbon Awards for role in the film My Grandpa and Best Supporting Actress in the 45th Japan Academy Film Prize for her role in the film And so the baton is passed.

She is known to Japanese television drama audiences for her portrayal as Saeko Takahashi in the Shitsuren Chocolatier and gained popularity by appearing in it.

Her agency is Horipro.

She was appointed for one of the 2020 Tokyo Olympics torch relay ambassadors.

Ishihara announced her marriage on October 1, 2020.

On January 10, 2022, Ishihara announced through her agency that she was pregnant and is expected to give birth around spring. On April 23, she gave birth to her first child.

Filmography

Television dramas

Films

Broadcasting
 Satomi Say To Me (Every Sunday, 9:30 PM, Nippon Hoso)

Awards and nominations

 2010 – Vogue Nippon Women of the Year 2010
 2011 – 9th Clarino Beautiful Legs Award 2011
 2012 – Japan Formal Association Best Formalist 2012
 2013 – U.S TC Candler Top 100 Beautiful Face - Rank 32nd
 2014 – The 27th Japan Best Dressed Eyes Awards (Arts category)
 2014 – U.S TC Candler Top 100 Beautiful Face - Rank 25th
 2014 – Yahoo! Japan Search Award 2014 - The most searched person for actress categories
 2015 - U.S TC Candler Top 100 Beautiful Face - Rank 19th
 2016 - U.S TC Candler Top 100 Beautiful Face - Rank 6th
 2017 - U.S TC Candler Top 100 Beautiful Face - Rank 34th

References

External links

 Official agency profile 
 JDorama profile 
 Dorama.info profile 
 mydramalist.info profile 
 

1986 births
Living people
Actresses from Tokyo
Japanese film actresses
Japanese television actresses
Japanese radio personalities
21st-century Japanese actresses
Asadora lead actors
Horipro artists